The Antilles gecko (Gonatodes antillensis) is a species of lizard in the Sphaerodactylidae family found in the West Indies and northern Venezuela.

References

Gonatodes
Reptiles described in 1887